Echis coloratus, known as the painted saw-scaled viper, painted carpet viper, Burton's carpet viper, and by other common names, is a highly venomous viper species endemic to the Middle East and Egypt. No subspecies are currently recognized.

Description

Common names
Painted saw-scaled viper, painted carpet viper, Burton's carpet viper, Palestine saw-scaled viper, Arabian saw-scaled viper, Mid-East saw-scaled viper.

Geographic range
It is found in the Middle East in Sinai, Israel, and Jordan. On the Arabian Peninsula it has been recorded from Saudi Arabia, Yemen, and Oman. In Africa it occurs in eastern Egypt east of the Nile and as far south as the 24th parallel.

The type locality given is "on Jebel Shárr, at an altitude of 4500 feet ... Midian" (Saudi Arabia, 1371 m altitude).

Habitat
It is not found in sandy deserts.

Taxonomy
In order to maintain nomenclatural stability, Stimson (1974) proposed that E. coloratus be validated over E. froenata. The ICZN subsequently gave coloratus precedence over froenata by use of its plenary powers.

References

Further reading
 Boulenger, G.A. 1896. Catalogue of the Snakes in the British Museum (Natural HIstory). Volume III., Containing the ... Viperidæ. London: Trustees of the British Museum (Natural History). (Taylor and Francis, printers). xiv + 727 pp. + Plates I.- XXV. (Echis coloratus, p. 507 + Plate XXV, Figure 1).
 Duméril, A.-M.-C., G. Bibron, and A.[-H.-A.] Duméril. 1854. Erpétologie générale ou histoire naturelle complète des reptiles. Tome septième. Deuxième partie. Comprenant l'histoire des serpents venimeux. Paris: Roret. xii + pp. 781–1536. ("Echis frœnata", pp. 1449–1450).
 Gunther, A. 1878. On Reptiles from Midian collected by Major Burton. Proc. Zool. Soc. London 1878: 977-978. (Echis colorata, p. 978).

External links

 Echis coloratus at CalPhotos. Accessed 2 August 2007.
 
 
 
 
 "What Fiery Flying Serpent Symbolized Christ?" at Meridian Magazine.  Accessed 16 December 2008.

Viperinae
Snakes of Africa
Vertebrates of Egypt
Reptiles of the Middle East
Snakes of Jordan
Reptiles described in 1878
Taxa named by Albert Günther